Mook-Molenhoek is a railway station in the southeastern Netherlands, in Molenhoek. The station originally opened on 1 June 1883 and is located on the Maaslijn (Nijmegen–Venlo). The station closed between 15 May 1938 and 15 May 1940 and finally closed on 1 October 1940. The station was re-opened on 6 May 2009. The services are currently operated by Arriva.

The station first opened as Mook, but was renamed to Mook-Middelaar in 1891 and to Mook-Molenhoek in 2009. The original station had a station building, but this was demolished in 1975 and has not been replaced.

Train services
The following local train services call at this station:
Stoptrein: Nijmegen–Venlo–Roermond
Stoptrein: Nijmegen–Venray

Bus services
1: from Nijmegen via Malden to Molenhoek
564: from Mook-Molenhoek to Groesbeek
883: from Nijmegen via Malden, Mook-Molenhoek, Middelaar, Milsbeek and Ottersum to Gennep

External links
NS website 
Dutch public transport travel planner 

Railway stations in Limburg (Netherlands)
Railway stations opened in 1883
Railway stations closed in 1940
Railway stations opened in 2009
Railway stations on the Maaslijn
Mook en Middelaar